Dr. Saturn may refer to:

Dr. Saturn, a character in the video game Battle Circuit
Dr. Saturn, a specific Mr. Saturn in the video game EarthBound
Dr. Saturn or Dr. Satan, a character in the tokusatsu series The Kagestar